The Treaty of Dresden was concluded on 28 June 1709, during the Great Northern War. It re-established the alliance between Frederik IV of Denmark-Norway and Augustus the Strong against the Swedish Empire.

Sources

External links
Scan of the treaty at IEG Mainz

Dresden
1709 treaties
Treaties of Denmark–Norway
Treaties of the Electorate of Saxony
1709 in Denmark
1709 in the Holy Roman Empire
18th century in Saxony
History of Dresden